is a former Japanese football player.

Club statistics

References

External links

1985 births
Living people
Association football people from Tokyo
Japanese footballers
J2 League players
Mito HollyHock players
Kamatamare Sanuki players
Expatriate footballers in Thailand
Association football forwards